NGC 5026 is a barred spiral galaxy or lenticular galaxy in the constellation of Centaurus. It was discovered on 5 June 1834 by John Herschel. It was described as "pretty bright, pretty large, round, gradually brighter middle" by John Louis Emil Dreyer, the compiler of the New General Catalogue.

References

Notes 

Barred spiral galaxies
Centaurus (constellation)
5026
046023
Discoveries by John Herschel